Christian Jost (born 29 September 1975), best known by his stage name Falk Maria Schlegel, is a German musician. He is best known as the keyboardist of power metal band Powerwolf.

Career 

Jost started as a keyboardist of a progressive thrash metal band The Experience in 1993. He created layout for their Insight album. He joined Red Aim in 2002 under the stage names Ray Kitzler and Ray Volver. In 2003, along with other Red Aim members he joined Powerwolf. He takes care of all the organizational matters of the band and is the link between management, record label and booking agency. He also takes care of the most important aspects of the tour planning, the logistic implementation of the various stage designs and all other applicable planning and implementation.

Personal life 
Jost lives in the Sankt Johann district of Saarbrücken. He claims that his main musical influences are Iron Maiden, Black Sabbath, Candlemass, Forbidden, Nevermore and Glen Hansard. He supports 1. FC Saarbrücken.

Discography

With Powerwolf 

 Return in Bloodred (2005)
 Lupus Dei (2007)
 Bible of the Beast (2009)
 Blood of the Saints (2011)
 Preachers of the Night (2013)
 Blessed & Possessed (2015)
 The Sacrament of Sin (2018)
 Call of the Wild (2021)
 Interludium (2023)

With Red Aim 
 Flesh for Fantasy (2002)
 Niagara (2003)

With The Experience 
 Mental Solitude (1995)
 Realusion (1996)
 Insight (1999)
 Cid: Reflections of a Blue Mind (2001)

References

External links 

Powerwolf members
Red Aim members
Heavy metal keyboardists
People from Saarbrücken
Living people
1975 births